Saint-Priest-Bramefant is a commune in the Puy-de-Dôme department in Auvergne-Rhône-Alpes in central France.

Tourism, places and monuments 
There is a 3-stars hotel in that commune.

Main monuments :
 Château de Maulmont (16th, 19th) 
 The church (Middle Age, 19th, 20th)

See also
Communes of the Puy-de-Dôme department

References

Saintpriestbramefant